Frank Emerson Andrews was an academic writer, foundation consultant who was a president of the Foundation Center in New York. He was also a director at the Russell Sage Foundation. He also served as an editor of Foundation Directory periodical.

Career
In 1928, he joined Russell Sage Foundation.

In 1956, he helped organize Foundation Library Center where served as a director and president until his retirement in 1967.

In August 1978, he died at the age of 78.

Bibliography 
 Harrison, Shelby M.; Andrews, F. Emerson (1946). American Foundations for Social Welfare
 Glenn, John M.; Brandt, Lilian; Andrews, F. Emerson (1947). Russell Sage Foundation, 1907-1946
 Andrews, F. Emerson (1950). Philanthropic Giving
 Andrews, F. Emerson (1952). Corporation Giving
 Andrews, F. Emerson (1953). Attitudes Toward Giving
 Andrews, F. Emerson (1956). Philanthropic Foundations
 Andrews, F. Emerson (1958). Legal Instruments of Foundations
Grugan's God
UpsideDown Town
Knights and Daze
Numbers, Please
Tenafly Public Library: A History

References 

1978 deaths
20th-century American writers